Center Grove is an unincorporated community in Houston County, Texas, United States.  It is located at the intersection of FM 1309 and FM 1280.

History 
Center Grove was founded in 1925 through the consolidation of Pine Grove and Center Hill.  In the 1930s, Center Grove had a few houses and a church.  As of 1990, it still consists of several houses.  Its last population estimate was 1966, where its population is 300.

Education 
Center Grove had a school that closed down sometime after 1964.  Students now attend Lovelady Independent School District.

References

Unincorporated communities in Houston County, Texas
Unincorporated communities in Texas